Edward Sholto Douglas-Pennant, 3rd Baron Penrhyn (10 June 1864 – 22 August 1927), was a British Conservative politician.

A member of the Douglas family headed by the Earl of Morton, Penrhyn was the son of George Douglas-Pennant, 2nd Baron Penrhyn, and his first wife Pamela Blanche, daughter of Sir Charles Rushout, 2nd Baronet. He entered Parliament for Northamptonshire South in the 1895 general election, a seat he held until 1900, when he was replaced by his brother-in-law Edward FitzRoy.

Douglas-Pennant served in the 1st Life Guards as a lieutenant, and later as a major in its Reserve Regiment. Afterwards he served in the Buckinghamshire (Royal Bucks Hussars) Imperial Yeomanry as major and later as lieutenant-colonel. On 1 July 1907 he was appointed Honorary Colonel of the 4th (Royal Carnarvon and Merioneth Militia) Battalion, Royal Welsh Fusiliers, a position that his father and grandfather had also held.

Lord Penrhyn married the Hon. Blanche Georgiana, daughter of Charles FitzRoy, 3rd Baron Southampton, in 1887. Their eldest son, the Hon. Alan George Sholto Douglas-Pennant, was killed in the First World War. Penrhyn died in August 1927 at age 63, and was succeeded in the barony by his second and only surviving son Hugh. Lady Penrhyn died in November 1944.

Notes

References
 Burke's Peerage, Baronetage and Knightage, 100th Edn, London, 1953.
 Kidd, Charles, Williamson, David (editors). Debrett's Peerage and Baronetage (1990 edition). New York: St Martin's Press, 1990, 
 Bryn Owen, History of the Welsh Militia and Volunteer Corps 1757–1908: 1: Anglesey and Caernarfonshire, Caernarfon: Palace Books, 1989, ISBN 1-871904-00-5.

1864 births
1927 deaths
3
Edward
British Life Guards officers
Royal Buckinghamshire Yeomanry officers
Carnarvon Militia officers
Conservative Party (UK) MPs for English constituencies
UK MPs 1895–1900
Penrhyn, B3
Eldest sons of British hereditary barons